Welcome Home: Live at the Arlington Theatre, Santa Barbara 1992 is a live album by alternative rock group Toad the Wet Sprocket.  Released by Columbia Records in 2004, it followed up the band's reunion tour in 2003, and is a chronicle of their first show in Santa Barbara, California following the success of their tour behind the platinum album fear.

Track listing 
All songs written by Toad the Wet Sprocket.

 "Walk on the Ocean" – 3:17
 "One Little Girl" – 3:42
 "Scenes from a Vinyl Recliner" – 4:26
 "All I Want" – 3:06
 "Jam" – 3:16
 "Before You Were Born" – 3:27
 "Butterflies" – 4:49
Closing interpolation of "Within You Without You" (The Beatles)
 "Torn" – 3:06
 "Chile" – 4:40
 "Nightingale Song" – 2:35
 "Brother" – 4:10
 "Hold Her Down" – 3:12
 "Come Back Down" – 3:05
 "Stories I Tell" – 5:03
 "Know Me" – 6:09
 Opening interpolation of "Spirit" (Mike Scott)
 Closing interpolation of "Unsatisfied" (The Replacements)
 "Way Away" – 3:21
 "Is It for Me" – 3:39
 "Fall Down" – 3:43
 "I Will Not Take These Things for Granted" – 5:33

References

2004 live albums
Toad the Wet Sprocket live albums
Columbia Records live albums